Juan Manuel Olivera López (born 14 August 1981) is a Uruguayan football player who is currently playing as a forward for Danubio.

Career
Olivera had a brief stint in Mexico with Cruz Azul during 2005.

Olivera played for Shaanxi Baorong during the 2007 Chinese Super League.

He switches on 9 January 2009 from Paraguayan football Club Libertad to Universidad de Chile

Universidad de Chile
Olivera returned to Universidad de Chile in 2009. During his previous stay with Universidad de Chile in 2005 he reached the finals of the Chilean tournament, during this time he was often paired with Marcelo Salas, scoring 7 goals in the Apertura and once in the Copa Sudamericana of 2005. Olivera is now part of Universidad de Chile starting lineup on regular basis, often deflecting balls with his head.

In July 2009, Olivera scored the goal that would end Universidad de Chile's 5-year title drought, defeating Unión Española in the final game of the Apertura play-offs of 2009. Olivera was the tournament's leading goal-scorer with 11 goals.

In August 2009, shortly after winning his first title with the Chilean club, Olivera signed a new contract with Universidad de Chile, extending his stay for another three years.

During his second sting with "la U", Olivera scored more than 50 goals in official games, doing this in the Chilean Tournament as well as in the Copa Libertadores and the Copa Sudamericana. Olivera left Universidad de Chile after the semifinals of 2010 Copa Libertadores, leaving as the top goal scorer of the Chilean Tournament with 16 goals, a position he retained until a month after his departure.

After his campaign with Club Universidad de Chile, the Arabic club Al-Shabab Riyadh signed the Olivera as its first option to reinforce its offense. Olivera accepted Al-Shabab's offer for 2 million dollars.

Peñarol
After a successful season in the Saudi league he had a strong desire to return to his former team, Peñarol. Eventually with his past experience at an intercontinental championship level with Club Universidad de Chile, but only to lose to Santos F.C. in the final.

Al Wasl
In the 2011–2012 season, Olivera accepted an offer from Al Wasl FC in Dubai to play in the UAE Football League under the supervision of the legendary Diego Maradona. He finished the season with 17 goals in all competitions with Al Wasl.

Estudiantes
On 23 January 2014, Olivera joined Argentine Primera División side Estudiantes de La Plata on a one-year loan deal.

Honours

Player
Universidad de Chile
 Primera División de Chile (1): 2009 Apertura

Manager
Peñarol U20
Under-20 Intercontinental Cup: runner up: 2022

References

External links
 

1981 births
Living people
Uruguayan footballers
Uruguayan expatriate footballers
Peñarol players
Danubio F.C. players
Club Atlético River Plate (Montevideo) players
Cruz Azul footballers
San Lorenzo de Almagro footballers
Club Libertad footballers
Universidad de Chile footballers
Suwon Samsung Bluewings players
Clube Náutico Capibaribe players
Estudiantes de La Plata footballers
Chilean Primera División players
Argentine Primera División players
K League 1 players
Campeonato Brasileiro Série A players
Uruguayan Primera División players
Expatriate footballers in Argentina
Expatriate footballers in Mexico
Expatriate footballers in Chile
Expatriate footballers in China
Expatriate footballers in Paraguay
Expatriate footballers in South Korea
Expatriate footballers in Saudi Arabia
Expatriate footballers in the United Arab Emirates
Expatriate footballers in Brazil
Uruguayan expatriate sportspeople in Argentina
Uruguayan expatriate sportspeople in Paraguay
Uruguayan expatriate sportspeople in Mexico
Uruguayan expatriate sportspeople in Chile
Uruguayan expatriate sportspeople in China
Uruguayan expatriate sportspeople in Brazil
Uruguayan expatriate sportspeople in South Korea
Chinese Super League players
Beijing Renhe F.C. players
Al-Shabab FC (Riyadh) players
Al-Wasl F.C. players
Saudi Professional League players
UAE Pro League players
Association football forwards